This is the list of top-ranked chess grandmasters, ordered by their peak Elo rating. The cut-off value is 2700 (players with a rating at or above this value are colloquially known as super grandmasters).

Notably only six players achieved their over-2700 peak before the year 2000 and twenty-one players achieved their respective peak between the years 2000 and 2009 (inclusive).

List

Highest ratings by decade
This section lists the top 20 active players by peak FIDE rating achieved in every decade since 1971, when FIDE started officially publishing rating lists.

1970s

1980s

1990s

2000s

2010s

2020s

List of rating peaks throughout history

See also
 Comparison of top chess players throughout history
 FIDE world rankings
 List of FIDE chess world number ones

Notes

References

External links
 A list of chess players by peak FIDE rating on 2700chess.com

Lists of chess players
Chess rating systems